Ogino Station may refer to either of the following two railway stations in Japan:
Ogino Station (Toyama)
Ogino Station (Fukushima)